Conor Donovan (born January 8, 1996) is an American professional soccer player who currently plays for Sacramento Republic in the USL Championship.

Early life and career
Born on January 8, 1996, Donovan began his soccer career playing for Cardinal Gibbons High School in Raleigh, North Carolina.

College
As a freshman, Donovan made 15 appearances for the NC State Wolfpack during the 2014 season, recording one goal and one assist.

Club career
Donovan was selected 22nd overall in the 2015 MLS SuperDraft. Donovan signed a Generation Adidas contract. He made his professional debut on June 17, 2015, in a Lamar Hunt U.S. Open Cup match against the Charleston Battery. Orlando went on to advance after winning 8–7 on penalties. On August 8, 2015, Donovan made his MLS debut against the Philadelphia Union; he tore the anterior cruciate ligament in his left knee in the 10th minute.

Donovan signed with the Rio Grande Valley FC Toros of the USL for 2018. On May 31, 2018, Donovan signed with RGVFC's MLS affiliate the Houston Dynamo. He started for the Dynamo in a 5-0 US Open Cup match win against NTX Reyados before being loaned back to RGVFC. On November 27, 2018, Houston declined Donovan's contract option.

Donovan returned to Rio Grande Valley for the 2019 season.

Following his release from Rio Grande Valley FC, Donovan returned to his home state and joined North Carolina FC of the USL Championship.

On January 12, 2021, Donovan moved to USL Championship side OKC Energy.

Donovan moved to Sacramento Republic on January 6, 2022, following OKC Energy's decision to go on a season-long hiatus.

International career
Donovan was called up to the United States U17 team for the 2013 CONCACAF U-17 Championship.

Donovan was called up to the United States U20 team for the 2015 CONCACAF U-20 Championship and the 2015 FIFA U-20 World Cup.

Career statistics

Honors

Houston Dynamo 

 US Open Cup: 2018

Personal
His sister, Caitlin Donovan, played college soccer for the Charlotte 49ers. He is of Irish and Italian descent.

References

External links
 
 NC State bio
 
 

1996 births
Living people
American soccer players
NC State Wolfpack men's soccer players
Orlando City SC players
Pittsburgh Riverhounds SC players
Orlando City B players
Rio Grande Valley FC Toros players
North Carolina FC players
OKC Energy FC players
People from Fuquay-Varina, North Carolina
Soccer players from North Carolina
Orlando City SC draft picks
Major League Soccer players
USL Championship players
United States men's youth international soccer players
United States men's under-20 international soccer players
2015 CONCACAF U-20 Championship players
Association football defenders
Houston Dynamo FC players
Sacramento Republic FC players